Willie Rogers (23 May 1883 – 8 August 1956) was an Australian rules footballer who played with Melbourne in the Victorian Football League (VFL).

Notes

External links 

1883 births
Australian rules footballers from Victoria (Australia)
Melbourne Football Club players
1956 deaths